Elections to Three Rivers Council were held on 7 May 1998.  One third of the council was up for election and the council stayed under no overall control.

After the election, the composition of the council was:
Liberal Democrat 23
Conservative 17
Labour 8

Election result

References
"Council poll results", The Guardian 9 May 1998 page 16

1998
1998 English local elections
1990s in Hertfordshire